Lakshmipasha Union is an Union Parishad under golapganj  of Sylhet  in the division of Sylhet , Bangladesh. It has an area of 43.82 km2 (16.92 sq mi) and a population of 10,512.

References

Unions of Lohagara Upazila, Narail
Unions of Narail District
Unions of Khulna Division